Jan Apell and Jonas Björkman defeated Todd Woodbridge and Mark Woodforde in the final, 6–4, 4–6, 4–6, 7–6(7–5), 7–6(8–6) to win the doubles tennis title at the 1994 ATP Tour World Championships.

Jacco Eltingh and Paul Haarhuis were the defending champions, but were defeated by Woodbridge and Woodforde in the semifinals.

Draw

Finals

Group A
Standings are determined by: 1. number of wins; 2. number of matches; 3. in two-players-ties, head-to-head records; 4. in three-players-ties, percentage of sets won, or of games won; 5. steering-committee decision.

Group B
Standings are determined by: 1. number of wins; 2. number of matches; 3. in two-players-ties, head-to-head records; 4. in three-players-ties, percentage of sets won, or of games won; 5. steering-committee decision.

References
ATP Tour World Championships Doubles Draw

Doubles
Tennis tournaments in Indonesia
1994 in Indonesian tennis
Sport in Jakarta